Pigeon Island is one of the Reef Islands in the Solomon Islands; it is located in Temotu Province, 360 nautical miles from Honiara. The island is 274 by 91 metres. In local language the island is called Ngarando, which means a faraway place.

References

Islands of the Solomon Islands